|}

The Florida Pearl Novice Chase is a Grade 2 National Hunt novice chase in Ireland which is open to horses aged five years or older. 
It is run at Punchestown over a distance of about 2 miles and 6½ furlongs (2 miles 6 furlongs and 140 yards, or 4,554 metres), and it is scheduled to take place each year in November.

The race is named in honour of Florida Pearl, who won a record four Irish Hennessy Gold Cups for Willie Mullins in the late 1990s and early 2000s.  

The race was known as the Irish Field Novice Chase until 2006. It was awarded Grade 3 status in 2003 and then raised to Grade 2 in 2011.

Records
Leading jockey since 1988 (3 wins):
 Barry Geraghty - Barrow Drive (2002), Forget The Past (2004), Purple Shuffle (2006)
 Ruby Walsh – Back In Focus (2012), Morning Assembly (2013), A Toi Phil (2016) Leading trainer since 1988 (4 wins):
 Gordon Elliott -  A Toi Phil (2016), Jury Duty (2017), Battleoverdoyen (2019), Pencilfulloflead (2020) ''

Winners since 1988

See also
 Horse racing in Ireland
 List of Irish National Hunt races

References
Racing Post:
 

National Hunt races in Ireland
National Hunt chases
Punchestown Racecourse